

2-D Man

3G4 

3G4 is a villain in the DC Universe. He first appears in Aquaman vol. 5 #37 (October 1997). He was created by Peter David and Jim Calafiore.

4-D 

4-D first appears in JLA #24 (December 1998) as part of the International Ultramarine Corps.

500Z-Q 

500Z-Q, also known as Soozie-Q, first appears in Hero Hotline #1 (April 1989) as part of the Hero Hotline team.

666

#711

8-Ball 

8-Ball is a character appearing in 100 Bullets, published by Vertigo. He first appears in 100 Bullets, #29 (October 2001). He was created by Brian Azzarello and Eduardo Risso.

 DC Comics characters: 0-9, List of